Arthur Bond may refer to:
 Arthur J. Bond (1939–2012), American academic
 Arthur D. Bond (1902–1983), American football player
 Arthur James F. Bond (1888–1958), English artist